Medicine is the seventh studio album by Drew Holcomb and The Neighbors, released on January 27, 2015 on Magnolia Music. Drew Holcomb and The Neighbors co-produced the album with Joe Pisapia. It is the successor to 2013's, Good Light. His wife and former band member, Ellie Holcomb, makes some appearances throughout the album.

Critical reception

Specifying in a 7.8 out of ten review by Paste, Hilary Saunders recognizes, the album "combine[s] those experiences of pragmatism and idealism, crafting a brand of country-tinged folk pop that balances artistic integrity with measured commerciality." Alex "Tincan" Caldwell, indicating in a four star review from Jesus Freak Hideout, realizes, the album has "these scrappy, down-home tunes might not be for everyone, but if you are up for some unvarnished, soulful songwriting at its best".  Anthony Peronto, highlighting in a five star review from Indie Vision Music, refers, "Medicine is the perfect remedy." Writing for Contactmusic.com in a three out of five review, Ruth Buxton-Cook reports, the album "will certainly cure the monotony of life with its rich, sentimental vibe and smooth folksy rhythm."

Track listing

Charts

References

2015 albums
Drew Holcomb and the Neighbors albums